In the mathematical discipline of set theory, forcing is a technique for proving consistency and independence results. It was first used by Paul Cohen in 1963, to prove the independence of the axiom of choice and the continuum hypothesis from Zermelo–Fraenkel set theory.

Forcing has been considerably reworked and simplified in the following years, and has since served as a powerful technique, both in set theory and in areas of mathematical logic such as recursion theory. Descriptive set theory uses the notions of forcing from both recursion theory and set theory. Forcing has also been used in model theory, but it is common in model theory to define genericity directly without mention of forcing.

Intuition 

Intuitively, forcing consists of expanding the set theoretical universe  to a larger universe . In this bigger universe, for example, one might have many new real numbers, identified with subsets of the set  of natural numbers, that were not there in the old universe, and thereby violate the continuum hypothesis.

While impossible when dealing with finite sets, this is just another version of Cantor's paradox about infinity. In principle, one could consider:

Forcing is a more elaborate version of this idea, reducing the expansion to the existence of one new set, and allowing for fine control over the properties of the expanded universe.

Cohen's original technique, now called ramified forcing, is slightly different from the unramified forcing expounded here. Forcing is also equivalent to the method of Boolean-valued models, which some feel is conceptually more natural and intuitive, but usually much more difficult to apply.

Forcing posets 

A forcing poset is an ordered triple, where  is a preorder on  that is atomless, meaning that it satisfies the following condition:

For each , there are  such that , with no  such that .
One reads  as " is stronger than ". Intuitively, the "smaller" condition provides "more" information, just as the smaller interval  provides more information about the number  than the interval  does.

There are various conventions in use. Some authors require  to also be antisymmetric, so that the relation is a partial order. Some use the term partial order anyway, conflicting with standard terminology, while some use the term preorder. The largest element can be dispensed with. The reverse ordering is also used, most notably by Saharon Shelah and his co-authors.

P-names 

Associated with a forcing poset  is the class  of -names. A -name is a set  of the form

This is actually a definition by transfinite recursion. With  the empty set,  the successor ordinal to ordinal ,  the power-set operator, and  a limit ordinal, define the following hierarchy:

 

Then the class of -names is defined as

The -names are, in fact, an expansion of the universe. Given , one defines  to be the -name

Again, this is really a definition by transfinite recursion.

Interpretation 

This is again a definition by transfinite recursion. Note that if , then . One then defines

so that .

Example 

In this case, one can talk about the conditions as being probabilities, and a -name assigns membership in a probabilistic sense. Due to the ready intuition this example can provide, probabilistic language is sometimes used with other divergent forcing posets.

Countable transitive models and generic filters 

The resulting class of all interpretations of -names will be a model of  that properly extends the original  (since ).

"Transitivity" means that if , then . The Mostowski collapse lemma states that this can be assumed if the membership relation is well-founded. The effect of transitivity is that membership and other elementary notions can be handled intuitively. Countability of the model relies on the Löwenheim–Skolem theorem.

As  is a set, there are sets not in  – this follows from Russell's paradox. The "filter" condition means that:

 
 
 if , then 
 if , then there exists an  such that 

For  to be "generic" means:

The existence of a generic filter  follows from the Rasiowa–Sikorski lemma. In fact, slightly more is true: Given a condition , one can find a generic filter  such that .

Forcing 

Given a generic filter , one proceeds as follows. Let 

Define  (to be read as " forces  in the model  with poset "), where  is a condition,  is a formula in the forcing language, and the 's are -names, to mean that if  is a generic filter containing , then . The special case  is often written as "" or simply "".

This is usually summarized as the following three key properties:

Coherence: .

This means that we define one relation  where  denotes type of formula as follows:
  means .
  means .
  means .

Let  be a formula defined by -induction:

R1.  if and only if .

R2.  if and only if .

R3.  if and only if .

More formally, we use following binary relation -names: Let  holds for names  and  if and only if  for at least one condition . This relation is well-founded, which means that for any name  the class of all names , such that  holds, is a set and there is no function  such that .

In general a well-founded relation is not a preorder, because it might not be transitive. But, if we consider it as an "ordering", it is a relation without infinite decreasing sequences and where for any element the class of elements below it is a set.

It is easy to close any binary relation for transitivity.
 (as a map with domain ) for some  such that ,  and for any ,  holds. Such an ordering is well-founded too.

We define the following well defined ordering on pairs of names:  if one of the following holds:
 
  and 

The relation  is defined by recursion on pairs  of names. For any pair it is defined by the same relation on "simpler" pairs. Actually, by the recursion theorem there is a formula  such that R1, R2 and R3 are theorems because its truth value at some point is defined by its truth values in "smaller" points relative to the some well-founded relation used as an "ordering". Now, we are ready to define forcing relation:
  means 
  means 
  means 
  means 
  means 

This is the definition of the forcing relation in the universe  of all sets regardless to any countable transitive model. However, there is a relation between this "syntactic" formulation of forcing and the "semantic" formulation of forcing over some countable transitive model .

 For any formula  there is a theorem  of the theory  (for example conjunction of finite number of axioms) such that for any countable transitive model  such that  and any atomless partial order  and any -generic filter  over  

This is called the property of definability of the forcing relation.

Consistency 

The discussion above can be summarized by the fundamental consistency result that, given a forcing poset , we may assume the existence of a generic filter , not belonging to the universe , such that  is again a set-theoretic universe that models . Furthermore, all truths in  may be reduced to truths in  involving the forcing relation.

Both styles, adjoining  to either a countable transitive model  or the whole universe , are commonly used. Less commonly seen is the approach using the "internal" definition of forcing, in which no mention of set or class models is made. This was Cohen's original method, and in one elaboration, it becomes the method of Boolean-valued analysis.

Cohen forcing 

Let  be a generic filter for this poset.

In fact,  is a total function. Given , let . Then  is dense. A condition  has  in its domain, and since , we find that  is defined.

Let , the set of all "yes" members of the generic conditions. It is possible to give a name for  directly. Let 

We claim that . Let 

Then  is dense. (Given any , find  that is not in its domain, and adjoin a value for  contrary to the status of "".) Then any  witnesses .

They are all distinct, by a density argument: Given , let 

 

then each  is dense, and a generic condition in it proves that the αth new set disagrees somewhere with the th new set.

This is not yet the falsification of the continuum hypothesis. One must prove that no new maps have been introduced which map  onto , or  onto . In other words,  has collapsed, and in the forcing extension, is a countable ordinal.

The last step in showing the independence of the continuum hypothesis, then, is to show that Cohen forcing does not collapse cardinals. For this, a sufficient combinatorial property is that all of the antichains of the forcing poset are countable.

The countable chain condition 

In the example on Borel sets, incompatibility means that  has zero measure. In the example on finite partial functions, incompatibility means that  is not a function, in other words,  and  assign different values to some domain input.

(The name, which is obviously inappropriate, is a holdover from older terminology. Some mathematicians write "c.a.c." for "countable antichain condition".)

It is easy to see that  satisfies the c.c.c. because the measures add up to at most . Also,  satisfies the c.c.c., but the proof is more difficult.

In other words, -antichains are countable.

The importance of antichains in forcing is that for most purposes, dense sets and maximal antichains are equivalent. A maximal antichain  is one that cannot be extended to a larger antichain. The existence of a maximal antichain follows from Zorn's Lemma. Given a maximal antichain , let 

Then  is dense, and  if and only if . Conversely, given a dense set , Zorn's Lemma shows that there exists a maximal antichain , and then  if and only if .

Assume that  satisfies the c.c.c.

 

By the definability of forcing, this definition makes sense within . By the coherence of forcing, a different  come from an incompatible . By c.c.c.,  is countable.

This has the following very important consequence. In particular, cardinals cannot collapse.

Easton forcing 

The exact value of the continuum in the above Cohen model, and variants like  for cardinals  in general, was worked out by Robert M. Solovay, who also worked out how to violate  (the generalized continuum hypothesis), for regular cardinals only, a finite number of times.

Easton's work was notable in that it involved forcing with a proper class of conditions. On the other hand, forcing with  introduces a countable enumeration of the ordinals.

At one time, it was thought that more sophisticated forcing would also allow an arbitrary variation in the powers of singular cardinals. Many open problems remain.

Random reals 

There are two types of important dense sets:

 For any positive integer  the set  is dense, where  is diameter of the set .
 For any Borel subset  of measure 1, the set  is dense.

For any filter  and for any finitely many elements  there is  such that holds . In case of this ordering, this means that any filter is set of compact sets with finite intersection property. For this reason, intersection of all elements of any filter is nonempty. If  is a filter intersecting the dense set  for any positive integer , then the filter  contains conditions of arbitrarily small positive diameter. Therefore, the intersection of all conditions from  has diameter 0. But the only nonempty sets of diameter 0 are singletons. So there is exactly one real number  such that .

Let  be any Borel set of measure 1. If  intersects , then .

The problem is that if , then  " is compact", but from the viewpoint of some larger universe ,  can be non-compact and the intersection of all conditions from the generic filter  is actually empty. Elements of the set  are bounded closed sets as closures of bounded sets. Therefore, 
is a set of compact sets with the finite intersection property and thus has nonempty intersection. Since  and the ground model  inherits a metric from the universe , the set  has elements of arbitrarily small diameter. Finally, there is exactly one real that belongs to all members of the set .

 

There is name  such that for any generic filter  holds 

 

Then 

 

holds for any condition .

Every Borel set can, non-uniquely, be built up, starting from intervals with rational endpoints and applying the operations of complement and countable unions, a countable number of times. The record of such a construction is called a Borel code. For example, if , then . If  has measure zero, then  has measure zero. This mapping  is injective.

For any set  such that  and " is a Borel set of measure 1" holds .

So given , a random real, one can show that 

Real numbers in  then correspond to Dedekind cuts of such functions, that is, measurable functions.

Boolean-valued models 

Perhaps more clearly, the method can be explained in terms of Boolean-valued models. In these, any statement is assigned a truth value from some complete atomless Boolean algebra, rather than just a true/false value. Then an ultrafilter is picked in this Boolean algebra, which assigns values true/false to statements of our theory. The point is that the resulting theory has a model that contains this ultrafilter, which can be understood as a new model obtained by extending the old one with this ultrafilter. By picking a Boolean-valued model in an appropriate way, we can get a model that has the desired property. In it, only statements that must be true (are "forced" to be true) will be true, in a sense (since it has this extension/minimality property).

Meta-mathematical explanation 

One way to interpret the argument is to assume that  is consistent and then prove that  combined with the new sentence is also consistent.

Each "condition" is a finite piece of information – the idea is that only finite pieces are relevant for consistency, since, by the compactness theorem, a theory is satisfiable if and only if every finite subset of its axioms is satisfiable. Then we can pick an infinite set of consistent conditions to extend our model.

Logical explanation 

Such problems are known as problems of relative consistency, one of which proves

The general schema of relative consistency proofs follows. As any proof is finite, it uses only a finite number of axioms:

 

For any given proof,  can verify the validity of this proof. This is provable by induction on the length of the proof.

 

Then resolve

 

By proving the following

it can be concluded that

 

which is equivalent to

 

which gives (*). The core of the relative consistency proof is proving (**). A  proof of  can be constructed for any given finite subset  of the  axioms (by  instruments of course).

Then it suffices to prove that there is at least one condition that forces .

Another approach uses the Reflection Theorem. For any given finite set of  axioms, there is a  proof that this set of axioms has a countable transitive model. For any given finite set  of  axioms, there is a finite set  of  axioms such that  proves that if a countable transitive model  satisfies , then  satisfies . By proving that there is finite set  of  axioms such that if a countable transitive model  satisfies , then  satisfies the hypothesis . Then, for any given finite set  of  axioms,  proves .

See also 
List of forcing notions
Nice name

References 
 Bell, J. L. (1985). Boolean-Valued Models and Independence Proofs in Set Theory, Oxford.

External links 
 Gunther, E.; Pagano, M.; Sánchez Terraf, P. Formalization of Forcing in Isabelle/ZF (Formal Proof Development, Archive of Formal Proofs)
Nik Weaver's book Forcing for Mathematicians was written for mathematicians who want to learn the basic machinery of forcing. No background in logic is assumed, beyond the facility with formal syntax which should be second nature to any well-trained mathematician.
Timothy Chow's article A Beginner's Guide to Forcing is a good introduction to the concepts of forcing that avoids a lot of technical detail.  This paper grew out of Chow's newsgroup article Forcing for dummies .  In addition to improved exposition, the Beginner's Guide includes a section on Boolean-valued models.
See also Kenny Easwaran's article A Cheerful Introduction to Forcing and the Continuum Hypothesis, which is also aimed at the beginner but includes more technical details than Chow's article.
Cohen, P. J. The Independence of the Continuum Hypothesis, Proceedings of the National Academy of Sciences of the United States of America, Vol. 50, No. 6. (Dec. 15, 1963), pp. 1143–1148.
Cohen, P. J. The Independence of the Continuum Hypothesis, II, Proceedings of the National Academy of Sciences of the United States of America, Vol. 51, No. 1. (Jan. 15, 1964), pp. 105–110.
Paul Cohen gave a historical lecture The Discovery of Forcing (Rocky Mountain J. Math. Volume 32, Number 4 (2002), 1071–1100) about how he developed his independence proof.  The linked page has a download link for an open access PDF but your browser must send a referer header from the linked page to retrieve it.
Akihiro Kanamori: Set theory from Cantor to Cohen